Sweet Passion is the twenty-third studio album by American singer Aretha Franklin.  It was released on May 19, 1977, by Atlantic Records. Following Franklin's Gold-certified 1976 soundtrack album, Sparkle, she paired up with Motown producer Lamont Dozier to produce Sweet Passion.  It was, however, a commercial and critical failure.

The album's lead single, "Break It To Me Gently", topped the Billboard R&B chart but peaked at No. 85 on the Hot 100 and dropped off the chart after two weeks.

Track listing

Side one
"Break It To Me Gently" (Marvin Hamlisch, Carole Bayer Sager) - 3:21 
"When I Think About You" (Aretha Franklin) - 4:46
"What I Did for Love" (Marvin Hamlisch, Edward Kleban) - 5:17
"No One Could Ever Love You More" (Lamont Dozier) - 3:36
"A Tender Touch" (Aretha Franklin) - 3:58

Side two
"Touch Me Up" (Lamont Dozier)- 4:38
"Sunshine Will Never Be The Same" (Lamont Dozier) - 3:36
"Meadows of Springtime" (Aretha Franklin) - 5:26
"Mumbles / I've Got the Music in Me" (Clark Terry, Aretha Franklin, Bias Boshell) - 3:40
"Sweet Passion" (Aretha Franklin) - 7:12

Personnel
 Aretha Franklin – vocals, keyboards (5, 9, 10)
 H. B. Barnum – rhythm arrangements (2, 3, 5, 8–10), horn arrangements (2, 3, 5, 8–10), string arrangements (2, 3, 5, 8, 10), keyboards (5)
 Ray Brown – bass guitar (3, 8, 9)
 Sonny Burke – keyboards (2, 3, 4, 6, 7)
 Joe Clayton – congas (1), percussion (5)
 Gary Coleman – percussion (2, 4, 6, 7, 10)
 Ronald Coleman – keyboards (2, 4, 6, 7)
 Lamont Dozier – rhythm arrangements (4, 7)
 Scott Edwards – bass guitar (2, 4, 6, 7, 10)
 James Gadson – drums (2, 4, 6, 7, 10)
 McKinley Jackson – rhythm arrangements (4, 6, 7), horn arrangements (6)
 Harold Mason – drums (1, 3, 5, 8, 9)
 Craig McMillian – guitar (3, 8, 9)
 Mike Morgan – guitar (3, 8, 9)
 Gene Page – horn and string arrangements (4, 7)
 David Paich – keyboards (1)
 Ray Parker Jr. – guitar (1, 2, 4, 5, 7, 10)
 Chuck Rainey – bass guitar (1, 5)
 Lee Ritenour – guitar (1, 4–6, 10)
 Sylvester Rivers – keyboards (1, 3, 8, 9)
 Bob Zimmitti – percussion (3, 8, 9)

Production
 Producers – Marvin Hamlisch and Carole Bayer Sager (Track 1); Lamont Dozier and Aretha Franklin (Tracks 2–10).
 Co-Producers on Track 1 – David Paich and Marty Paich.
 Engineers – Frank Kemjar (Tracks 1, 5 & 10); Reginald Dozier (Tracks 2, 4, 6–8); Barney Perkins (3, 6 & 9).
 Mixing – Reginald Dozier (Tracks 2–10); Barney Perkins (Track 6).
 Recorded and Mixed at ABC Recording Studios (Los Angeles, CA) and Whitney Recording Studios (Glendale, CA).
 Track 1 mixed at Studio 55 (Los Angeles, CA).
 Mastered by Dennis King at Atlantic Studios (New York, NY).
 Art Direction – Bob Defrin
 Photography – David Alexander

References

1977 albums
Aretha Franklin albums
Albums arranged by Gene Page
Albums arranged by H. B. Barnum
Albums produced by Lamont Dozier
Atlantic Records albums